The women's 100 metres hurdles event at the 2016 IAAF World U20 Championships was held at Zdzisław Krzyszkowiak Stadium on 22, 23 and 24 July.

Medalists

Records

Results

Final
24 July
Start time: 16:04  Temperature: 25 °C  Humidity: 61 %
Wind: +2.0 m/s

Semifinals
23 July
First 2 in each heat (Q) and the next 2 fastest (q) advance to the Final

Summary

Details
First 2 in each heat (Q) and the next 2 fastest (q) advance to the Final

Semifinal 1
23 July
Start time: 17:13  Temperature: 22 °C  Humidity: 65 %
Wind: +0.6 m/s

Semifinal 2
23 July
Start time: 17:21  Temperature: 22 °C  Humidity: 65 %
Wind: -0.1 m/s

Semifinal 3
23 July
Start time: 17:30  Temperature: 22 °C  Humidity: 65 %
Wind: +0.9 m/s

Heats
22 July
First 3 in each heat (Q) and the next 6 fastest (q) advance to the Semi-Finals

Summary

Details
First 3 in each heat (Q) and the next 6 fastest (q) advance to the Semi-Finals

Heat 1
22 July
Start time: 9:34  Temperature: 21 °C  Humidity: 49 %
Wind: +2.0 m/s

Heat 2
22 July
Start time: 9:41  Temperature: 21 °C  Humidity: 49 %
Wind: +1.6 m/s

Heat 3
22 July
Start time: 9:48  Temperature: 21 °C  Humidity: 49 %
Wind: +1.3 m/s

Heat 4
22 July
Start time: 9:55  Temperature: 21 °C  Humidity: 49 %
Wind: +0.7 m/s

Note:
IAAF Rule 168.7 - Not jumping each hurdle
IAAF Rule 168.7(b) - Deliberately knocking down a hurdle

Heat 5
22 July
Start time: 10:02  Temperature: 21 °C  Humidity: 49 %
Wind: +1.5 m/s

Heat 6
22 July
Start time: 10:10  Temperature: 21 °C  Humidity: 49 %
Wind: +1.0 m/s

References

External links
 

100 metres hurdles
Sprint hurdles at the World Athletics U20 Championships
2016 in women's athletics